Roberta Floris (born 27 April 1979 in Cagliari, Sardinia) is an Italian journalist, television presenter and former model.

Biography 
Roberta Floris was born on April 27, 1979 in Cagliari (Sardinia), to father Giorgio Floris and mother Caterina Placco and is the third of three daughters: one of whom is called Rosanna. Not to be confused with the homonymous cousin, Roberta Floris (wife of actor Lorenzo Flaherty and daughter of Senator Emilio Floris), and both are the granddaughters of the politician and trade unionist Mario Floris.

Career 
Roberta Floris attended high school at the Liceo classico Giovanni Maria Dettori in Cagliari. In 1998 finishing high school and obtaining a diploma, she decides to enroll in Law in the Faculty of Law at the University of Cagliari, obtaining her degree with a thesis entitled A constitutional right to quality television. She is enrolled in the register of the Sardinia journalists in the Professional category, since 19 June 2014 she becomes a professional journalist.

In 1997 she participated in the Miss Italia beauty pageant, where she was ranked fourth.

In 2008, after various television experiences, she starts working in Sardinia as a journalist on TG1 for the regional broadcaster Sardegna Uno, where she leads and prepares the news; she signs in-depth services; she edited a weekly column and collaborated in the realization of the news, economic and political broadcast of the newspaper. Due to the results achieved during the year, the Sardegna Live editorial team decided to include Roberta among the candidates for the Sardegna Live Award in the category of the Sardinian of the year 2018.

In 2012 she moved to Rome, starting her national career. You start working for a private national broadcaster ABC, in the on which he conducted the TG33 and at the same time covered in which you cover the role of head of the institutional sector, taking care of the information space of a digital terrestrial channel, taking care of the press area and collaborating in the organization of events related to the world of communications.

Subsequently she participates in the training course for professional journalists, organized by the National Order. You write articles on socio-economic, cultural and tourism-related issues, coordinating and moderating debates.

In 2013 she was chosen to conduct the public presentation of the Holy Father, Pope Francis, on the occasion of the pastoral visit to Sardinia. In the same year, you began to work at the Authority for Communications Guarantees, in the staff of the Commissioner for Infrastructures and Networks, Antonio Preto.

In 2016 you won the Pentapolis Award in the Journalists for sustainability category. On 19 September 2018 she was interviewed by Gigi Marzullo in the Sottovoce program, broadcast on Rai 1. In 2017 and 2018 she worked as a presenter and correspondent in the editorial staff of TgCom24. In 2018 and 2019 you hosted TG4 broadcast on Rete 4 and then from 2019 to 2021 you hosted Studio Aperto broadcast on Italia 1. At the same time, in addition to conducting Studio Aperto, she also held the role of correspondent.

In 2018, after moving to News Mediaset, she hosted a TG4 column entitled L'almanacco di Retequattro on Rete 4, with which she alternated weekly with Viviana Guglielmi. The column offered a whole series of services dedicated to food, well-being, climate, lifestyle and gossip. On 17 May 2019 he presented the final of the sixth edition of ContaminationLab, at the Massimo theater in Cagliari. On June 30 of the same year you made a report for L'arca di Noè, a TG5 column broadcast every Sunday at 1:40 pm on Canale 5. On 28 January 2020 he moderated the Caserme Verdi project in Cagliari.

From 2020 she was hired in the editorial staff of TG5 in Rome (where she had already worked in the editorial office in 2015 and 2016), under the direction of Clemente J. Mimum, where from 2020 she leads the TG5 Prima Pagina aired on Canale 5 and then again from 2020 she leads the 8:00 edition of TG5, while from 2020 to 2022 it also hosted the Flash edition on air at 10:50 a.m, while in 2022 he directed the 1:00 p.m. edition of TG5 and prior to this latest edition he also directed the Flash edition broadcast at 10:50 a.m. In addition to directing the news, she also holds the role of correspondent. In 2021 you were awarded the Féminas Prize in the Communication category.

In 2022 to celebrate the thirty years of TG5 history, january 15 she was interviewed together with her colleagues Simona Branchetti and Susanna Galeazzi in the Verissimo program broadcast on Canale 5 with the conduct of Silvia Toffanin. On May 28 of the same year, he led the award ceremony for the third edition of the Costa Smeralda Prize, at the Porto Cervo Congress Centre. The following August 13, she returned to Porto Cervo on the occasion of the celebrations of the sixty years of the Costa Smeralda.

Television programs

Newsrooms

Awards and nominations

References

External links 

 
 
 

1979 births
Journalists from Rome
Italian women journalists
People from Cagliari
Mass media people from Rome
Living people